Jocko is a nickname, often for John or Joseph. Notable people named Jocko include:

Jocko Anderson (1892–1960), Canadian professional ice hockey player
Joseph J. Clark (1893–1971), Native American US Navy admiral
Jocko Collins (1905–1986), National Basketball Association referee and supervisor of officials
Jocko Conlan (1899–1989), American Hall-of-Fame Major League Baseball umpire
Jocko Conlon (1897–1987), Major League Baseball player
Jocko Cunningham (born 1950), former racing driver who competed in the SCCA/ECAR Formula Atlantic series from 1986 to 1990
Jocko Fields (1864–1950), Major League Baseball player
Jocko Flynn (1864–1907), Major League Baseball pitcher
Joaquín "Jack" García (born 1952), retired undercover FBI agent
Jack Gotta (1929–2013), American football player, coach and general manager, mainly in the Canadian Football League
Jocko Halligan (1868–1945), Major League Baseball player
Jocko Henderson (1918–2000), American radio personality
Luke Johnson (musician) (born 1981), English rock musician, drummer and songwriter
Jocko Maggiacomo (born 1947), NASCAR Winston Cup series driver
Jocko Marcellino (born 1950), American singer, musician, songwriter, producer, actor and one of the founders of the American rock and roll group Sha Na Na
Sherman Maxwell (1907–2008), African-American sportscaster and chronicler of Negro league baseball
Jocko Milligan (1861–1923), Major League Baseball catcher
Jack Nelson (American football) (1927–1978), American college and National Football League coach
Jocko Sims (born 1981), American actor best known for his role as Anthony Adams (aka Panic) on the Starz network series Crash
Gwyn Thomas (reporter) (1913–2010), Canadian crime reporter
Jocko Thompson (1917–1988), Major League Baseball pitcher
John "Jocko" Willink (born 1972), retired United States Navy SEAL, author of Extreme Ownership, host of Jocko Podcast

See also
Jocko (walrus), a Pacific walrus at the Six Flags Discovery Kingdom in Vallejo California
Jock (disambiguation)

Lists of people by nickname